Mount Harcourt is a mountain that rises over 1,535 m and is situated 5 mi east of Mount Kyffin located at the north end of Commonwealth Range, within the Queen Maud Mountains on the Dufek Coast at the Ross Dependency in Antarctica. It overlooks the east side of the Beardmore Glacier at its junction with the Ross Ice Shelf.

It was discovered In December 1908 by the British Antarctic Expedition (1907–09) under Ernest Shackleton, who named this feature.

External Links 

 Mount Harcourt on USGS website
 Mount Harcourt on the Antarctica New Zealand Digital Asset Manager website
 Mount Harcourt on AADC website
  Mount Harcourt on SCAR website
 Mount Harcourt on peakery.com website

References 

Mountains of the Ross Dependency
Dufek Coast